Thitarodes biruensis is a species of moth of the family Hepialidae. It is found in Xizang, China.

References

Moths described in 2002
Endemic fauna of China
Moths of Asia
Hepialidae